During the 2010–11 season, the Guildford Flames participated in the semi-professional English Premier Ice Hockey League. It was the 19th year of ice hockey played by the Guildford Flames and the fourth season under Paul Dixon as head coach.

The off season saw changes at the club with 5 new roster members. Miroslav Hala became the club's first ever foreign netminder. Defenceman Joe Graham came south from the Manchester Phoenix. David Longstaff, who had spent the previous eight seasons with the Newcastle Vipers, arrived in Guildford, and he was joined by ex-Viper teammate Ben Campbell. Matt Towe made up the quintet joining the Flames for the 2010–11 season when he arrived from the Cardiff Devils.

The Flames got off to their best start in five years, winning ten games on the trot, before finally suffering their first defeat for the new season, with a 4–2 loss on home ice against the Slough Jets in late October. A quick return to winning ways saw the Guildford Flames holding down a .750 winning percentage through to Christmas in the following sixteen games, suffering just two additional regulation time defeats since the opening loss. Just after the Christmas period the Flames suffered a minor setback when they lost consecutive games for the first time in the season. They won six out of their next ten games – but once again in this period suffered consecutive losses at the end of January. The Flames also suffered heartache when they lost out on a place in the Cup Final when they lost 12–9 on aggregate in their two-legged semi-final against the Slough Jets. However their fortunes would change and they ended the regular season on a twelve-game winning streak (thirteen if you include the Cup semi-final, second leg against the Slough Jets). The Flames had great momentum heading into the EPL playoffs. They drew the 7th place Swindon Wildcats in the home and away quarter final, and were able to secure a 15–5 aggregate win to advance, for the 6th consecutive season, to the finals weekend in Coventry.  In the semi-final against the Peterborough Phantoms, they picked up a 6–1 win to advance to the championship game against the Milton Keynes Lightning.

In the final, the Lightning took the lead, but three Flames goals gave them a two-goal lead heading into the second period. The Lighting powerplay cut the lead to a single goal in the middle frame, and they managed to pull even with about ten minutes to play in regulation time. A Matt Towe major penalty for high sticking looked to have put the Guildford Flames firmly on the back foot, but in an ironic twist, a thwarted shorthanded breakaway by Martin Masa with less than eight minutes to go was awarded a penalty shot. The Czech forward, made no mistake, and calmly tucked the puck home for a 4–3 lead. Nathan Rempel then secured the victory with a last minute empty netter and in the process won the Guildford Flames the EPL playoff title – for the first time in the club's history.

Player statistics

Netminders

Results

Pre-season

Regular season

Play-offs

League table

[*] Secured a playoff berth. [**] EPL League champions

 Manchester Phoenix are the 2010–2011 English Premier League champions.

References

External links
Official Guildford Flames website

Guil
Guildford Flames seasons